Era notte a Roma is a 1960 Italian war film epic directed by Roberto Rossellini. In France the film is known as Les Évadés de la nuit, and in the USA Escape by Night. It is also known internationally as Blackout in Rome.

Cast
Giovanna Ralli ...  Esperia Belli
Renato Salvatori ...  Renato Balducci
Leo Genn ...  Major Michael Pemberton (British)
Sergei Bondarchuk ...  Sgt. Fyodor Nazukov (Russian)
Peter Baldwin ...  Lt. Peter Bradley (American)
Paolo Stoppa ...  Principe Alessandro Antoniani
Enrico Maria Salerno ...  Dr. Costanzi
Hannes Messemer ...  Colonel/Baron von Kleist 
Sergio Fantoni  ...  Don Valerio 
Laura Betti  ...  Teresa
Rosalba Neri  ...  Erika Almagid
 George Petrarca  ...  Tarcisio

References

External links
 

Italian epic films
1960s Italian-language films
Films set in Rome
1960 films
1960s war drama films
Italian Campaign of World War II films
Films about Italian resistance movement
Films directed by Roberto Rossellini
Italian war drama films
1960 drama films
Films scored by Renzo Rossellini
French World War II films
Italian World War II films
1960s Italian films
1960s French films